Messina Cathedral is a Roman Catholic cathedral located in Messina, Sicily. Formerly the episcopal seat of the Diocese of Messina, it became in 1986 the archiepiscopal seat of the Archdiocese of Messina-Lipari-Santa Lucia del Mela.

In June 1947 Pope Pius XII granted it the status of a minor basilica.

Built by the Normans, it was consecrated in 1197 by the Archbishop Berardo. Henry VI, Holy Roman Emperor and Constance I of Sicily were present to witness the ceremony. The current building is the final result of some twentieth-century reconstructions, which took place following the disastrous earthquake that struck Messina in 1908 and the considerable damage that resulted from the heavy aerial bombardment in World War II.

Only the perimeter walls, the Gothic portal and an apse remained standing after the catastrophic earthquake which also destroyed surrounding edifices in Piazza Duomo. In 1943 incendiary bombs fell on the restored roof destroying much of its interior. Only an original mosaic and statue survived.

The tower houses the Messina astronomical clock, the largest astronomical clock in the world.

See also
 History of early modern period domes

References

External links 

Churches completed in 1197
Roman Catholic cathedrals in Italy
Roman Catholic churches in Messina
Cathedrals in Sicily
Minor basilicas in Sicily
Henry VI, Holy Roman Emperor